The Very Best of Sister Sledge 1973–93 is a greatest hits album by American vocal group Sister Sledge, released in 1993. Featuring the biggest hit singles of Sister Sledge, the album also includes two new Sure Is Pure remixes of "We Are Family" and "Lost in Music", both released as singles in 1993 and reaching number 5 and 14 in the UK Singles Chart respectively.

Track listing
"We Are Family" (Bernard Edwards, Nile Rodgers) – from We Are Family
"He's the Greatest Dancer" (Bernard Edwards, Nile Rodgers) – from We Are Family
"All American Girls" (Allee Willis, Joni Sledge, Lisa Walden, Narada Michael Walden) – from All American Girls
"Smile" (Kathy Sledge, Phil Lightfoot) – from Bet Cha Say That to All the Girls
"Love Don't You Go Through No Changes On Me" (Gwen Guthrie, Patrick Grant) – from Circle of Love
"Pretty Baby" (Bernard Edwards, Nile Rodgers) – from Love Somebody Today
"Got to Love Somebody" (Bernard Edwards, Nile Rodgers) – from Love Somebody Today
"Dancing On the Jagged Edge" (David Paul Bryant, Dennis Herring, Lorelei McBroom) – from When the Boys Meet the Girls
"Frankie" (Denise Rich) – from When the Boys Meet the Girls
"Lost in Music" (Bernard Edwards, Nile Rodgers) – from We Are Family
"Thinking of You" (Bernard Edwards, Nile Rodgers) – from We Are Family
"Mama Never Told Me" (Phil Hurtt, Tony Bell) – non-album single
"Reach Your Peak" (Bernard Edwards, Nile Rodgers) – from Love Somebody Today
"Let's Go On Vacation" (Bernard Edwards, Nile Rodgers) – from Love Somebody Today
"My Guy" (Smokey Robinson) – from The Sisters
"All the Man I Need" (featuring David Simmons) (Dean Pitchford, Michael Gore) – from The Sisters
"We Are Family" (Sure Is Pure Remix Edit) (Bernard Edwards, Nile Rodgers) – previously unreleased
"Lost in Music" (Sure Is Pure Remix) (Bernard Edwards, Nile Rodgers) – previously unreleased

Charts and certifications

Weekly charts

Certifications

References

External links
The Very Best of Sister Sledge 1973–93 at Discogs

Sister Sledge albums
Albums produced by Nile Rodgers
Albums produced by Bernard Edwards
1993 compilation albums
Rhino Entertainment albums